Sunny Joseph (born 12 October 1957) is an Indian cinematographer and director from Kerala, most known for his work in Shaji N. Karun classic, Piravi, for which he won the 1988 Kerala State Film Award for Best Photography and Caméra d'Or — Mention Spéciale at the 1989 Cannes Film Festival. He has Post Graduate Diploma in Cinematography from the Film and Television Institute of India (FTII), Pune. He is a former Chairman and General Secretary of Indian Society of Cinematographers, (ISC).

Early life and education
Born in 1957 in Kerala to CV Joseph and Thressiamma, he grew up in the household of two brothers (including a twin brother), and six younger sisters. Sunny did his P.D.C. from St. Michael's College, Cherthala (Kerala University) in Alappuzha district in 1974, followed by B.Sc. in Zoology (completed course) from Deva Matha College, Kuravilangad, in the Kottayam district in 1977. He joined the Film and Television Institute of India (FTII), Pune in 1979, where he did a course - Diploma in Cinema, specializing in Motion Picture Photography and graduated in 1983.

Career
After graduating from Film and Television Institute of India, Pune in 1983, Sunny Joseph started working as a cinematographer in 1987. Piravi the film which he photographed for Shaji N. Karun became a landmark in his career and in Indian Cinema.

In 2002, Sunny assisted veteran cinematographer and Adoor Gopalakrishnan long-time collaborator, Mankada Ravi Varma, in his last work, Nizhalkuthu (2002) and eventually shot many scenes in the film for which Sunny is credited alongside Mankada Ravi Varma.

Selected filmography

 Theertham (1987)
 Piravi (1988)
 Ore Thooval Pakshikal (1988)
 Eenam Maranna Kattu (1988)
 Unni (1989)
 Pooram (1989)
 Alicinte Anveshanam (1989)
 Ottayal Pattalam (1990)
 Ottayadipathakal (1990)
 Kshanakathu (1990)
 Vasthuhara (1991)
 Aanaval Mothiram (1991)
 Satyaprathinja (1991)
 Mangamma (1997)
 Kahini
 Sanabi (1995)
 Mogamul (1995)
 America! America!! (1997)
 Daya (1998)
 Train to Pakistan (1998)
 Angene Oru Avadhikkalathu (1999)
 Oru Cheru Punchiri (2000)
 Nizhalkuthu (2002)
 Dance Like A Man (2003)
 Thilaadanam (2002)
 Daivanamathil
 Kamli (2006)
 Ami, Yasin Ar Amar Madhubala (2007)
 Chintu Ji
 Janala
 O Maria (2011)
 Ramanujan (2014)
 Sweet Home (2014)
 Moral Nights (2021)
 Tayaa Under production

References

External links
 Official website
 
 Interview with Sunny Joseph -Cinematographer

1957 births
Living people
Cinematographers from Kerala
Film and Television Institute of India alumni
Kerala State Film Award winners
University of Kerala alumni
Malayalam film cinematographers
People from Alappuzha district
Tamil film cinematographers
20th-century Indian film directors
Film directors from Kerala
20th-century Indian photographers